Žydrūnas Savickas (born July 15, 1975) is a Lithuanian powerlifter and professional strongman. Due to his prolific  84 international wins in all major international strongman competitions, as well as his longevity in the sport, he is widely considered by many to be the greatest strength athlete of all time.

Career
Žydrūnas Savickas first became interested in strength sports after watching a Lithuanian strongman contest on TV in 1989. Three years later, he took part in that same strongman contest, and defeated a number of older and more experienced competitors. At age 17, Savickas began to train in powerlifting. In his second powerlifting contest, he broke all the Lithuanian records.
 
In 1998, Žydrūnas Savickas won his first Lithuania's Strongest Man contest. He would later go on to win this contest a total of 16 times. Savickas then competed in the 1998 and 2000 World's Strongest Man contests, but failed to qualify for the finals both times.

2001–2008
In 2001, a contest in the Faroe Islands dealt Savickas a major setback, as he tore both patellar tendons during the Conan's Wheel event. Many believed that the extent of the injury meant that his career was over. However, nine months later, Savickas won the Lithuanian powerlifting championships and a short time later, he also won the 2002 Lithuania's Strongest Man contest. Savickas would go on to finish in 2nd place at the 2002 World's Strongest Man in Kuala Lumpur, Malaysia. He would finish in 2nd place five more times in 2003, 2004, 2011, 2013 and 2015 and 1st place at the 2009, 2010, 2012 and 2014 World's Strongest Man contests.
 
Savickas won the Arnold Strongman Classic six consecutive times from 2003 to 2008. Savickas won the IFSA European Championships in 2005 which qualified him for the IFSA World Championships. In September 2005, he broke three world records and won the IFSA Strongman World Championships in Quebec, Canada. In December 2005, Savickas won the IFSA World Team Championships with Team Europe and won the IFSA World Championships for the 2nd time in 2006 in Reykjavík, Iceland.
 
On October 24, 2005, Savickas represented Lithuania in a team competition with Vidas Blekaitis, Saulius Brusokas, and Vilius Petrauskas. Team Lithuania placed 5th overall at the IFSA World's Strongest Nation contest in Ukraine.
 
In September 2007, Savickas finished in 3rd place at the last ever IFSA World Championships behind runner-up Mikhail Koklyaev and champion Vasyl Virastyuk in Geumsan, South Korea.
 
Savickas won 5 out of the 7 total contests during the inaugural 2008 Strongman Champions League season and won the 2008 overall title 58 points ahead of second-place finisher Ervin Katona.

2009–2010
In June 2009, Savickas won Fortissimus after finishing runner-up in 2008 behind Derek Poundstone. On October 3, 2009, Savickas won the 2009 World's Strongest Man competition ahead of defending champion Mariusz Pudzianowski.
 
On the set of Lo Show dei Record in Rome, Italy on April 1, 2010, Savickas set a record of 70 metres (229 ft 7 in) for the longest distance carrying a 300 kg yoke. The record was part of the Italian TV series Lo Show dei Record. In June 2010, Savickas won the Europe's Strongest Man competition.
 
In September 2010, Savickas and Brian Shaw tied for points at the 2010 World's Strongest Man competition, but Savickas won on countback. He also set a new world record for the Giant Wooden Log Lift by lifting .
 
Savickas is the 3-time reigning World Log Lift Championships winner in 2008, 2009, and 2011 (no contest was held in 2010).

2011
In April 2011, Savickas set a new Guinness World Record performing a 20-meter Farmer's Walk in 7.55 seconds with  implements in each hand. The event was broadcast on the Guinness TV show in Europe.
 
Savickas won five Strongman Champions League events during the 2011/2012 season, in Finland in March 2011, Germany on April 16, 2011, the SCL Semi-finals in Canada in October 2011, Latvia in November 2011 and the SCL Finals in Sarajevo, Bosnia on February 7, 2012. Ervin Katona won the overall championships, with Savickas as the runner-up. This was his 7th consecutive world record in the Log Lift, not including his world record in the Giant Wooden Log Lift set at the 2010 World's Strongest Man contest.
 
In September 2011, Savickas lost his WSM crown to Brian Shaw at the 2011 World's Strongest Man contest at Wingate University, North Carolina coming in second place for the fourth time.

2012
Savickas won the 2012 Europe's Strongest Man contest on June 23, 2012, his second ESM title after winning in 2010. This was his 8th consecutive Log Lift world record.
 
Savickas won 11 of the 14 Strongman Champions League contests in the 2012 season and won the overall championships title. This was Savickas' third Log Lift world record in 2012 and 9th consecutive Log Lift world record.
 
On October 1, 2012, Savickas regained the WSM crown by winning the 2012 World's Strongest Man contest in Los Angeles, California. This was Savickas' third WSM title and he is the fifth competitor in WSM history to win three or more WSM titles.
 
On October 7, 2012, Savickas won the 2012 World Log Lift Championships which was held at the same venue as the SCL Savickas Classic event. This was his fourth consecutive World Log Lift Championships title.

2013
Savickas won his inaugural 2013 contest, the Strongman Champions League Holland event held in Kalkar, Germany on June 22, 2013. Savickas won seven SCL contests in the 2013 season and came second in the overall championships behind Krzysztof Radzikowski.
 
On June 29, 2013, Savickas won his third Europe's Strongest Man title.
 
In August 2013, Savickas finished second in the 2013 World's Strongest Man contest behind Brian Shaw.

2014
In the 2014 World's Strongest Man, he managed to win his fourth title with just half a point difference over the second placed Hafthór Júlíus Björnsson. Zydrunas set a new world record in the giant barbell squat event by squatting  for 15 repetitions.

Personal records

Powerlifting
Done in official powerlifting competitions under IPF rules (single-ply equipment).
 Squat –  (2005 Lithuanian National Championships) (Lithuanian record)
 Bench press –  (2004 Lithuanian National Championships) (Lithuanian record)
 Deadlift –  (2004 Lithuanian National Championships) (Lithuanian record)
 Total –  (425|265.5|400) (2004 Lithuanian National Championships) (Lithuanian record)

Strongman
 Log lift for Max Weight –  (former world record, 2015 Arnold Classic Brazil Strongman Pro, Rio de Janeiro, Brazil)
 Giant Barbell Squat for Reps –  × 15 single-ply suit w/ wraps (World record, 2014 World's Strongest Man, Los Angeles, California)
 Ironmind S-Cubed Bar Deadlift at 1-inch deficit (with straps) –  (former World record, 2011 World's Strongest Man, Wingate, North Carolina) 
 Rogue Elephant Bar Deadlift (raw with straps) –  (2016 Arnold Strongman Classic, Columbus, Ohio)
 Apollon's Axle Press for Max Weight –  (2010 Giants Live, Istanbul, Turkey)
 Apollon's Axle Press for Reps –  × 8 clean and press each rep (World record, 2006 Arnold Strongman Classic, Columbus, Ohio)
 Apollon's Axle Press for Reps –  × 2 clean and press each rep (World record, 2010 Arnold Strongman Classic, Columbus, Ohio)
 Giant Wooden Log lift for Max Weight –  (World Record, 2010 World's Strongest Man, Sun City, South Africa)
 Apollon's Wheels Overhead for Reps –  × 8 reps
 Giant Barbell Deadlift for Reps –  × 10 (World record, 2006 IFSA World Championships, Reykjavík, Iceland)
 Atlas Stones (140-180 kg set) – 25.65 seconds (World record, 2006 IFSA World Championships, Reykjavík, Iceland)
 Metal Block press –  (former World record, 2011 World's Strongest Man, Wingate, North Carolina)
 Hummer Tire Deadlift for Max Weight –  (former World record 2014 Arnold Strongman Classic, Columbus, Ohio)
 Heavy Super Yoke  – for 4 meters in 3.87 seconds (World record, 2014 Arnold Strongman Classic, Columbus, Ohio)During training:
 Squat –  for 2 reps;  for 3 reps;   for 5 reps Raw with knee wraps Bench press –  for 1 rep;  for 3 reps
 Deadlift –  raw with straps on stiff Power bar Deadlift –  for 5 reps in preparation for Arnold Strongman Classic 2014 raw with straps on stiff Power bar Standing Overhead Press –  for 5 reps without leg drive Standing Overhead Press –  for 1 rep
 Log Lift –  for 5 reps in preparation for Arnold Strongman Classic 2015  on steel IFSA log Front Squat –  for 5 reps Raw with knee wraps Front Squat –  for 3 reps Raw with knee wraps 18 inch deadlift –  for 1 rep in preparation for Arnold Strongman Classic 2014  Raw with straps on stiff Power bar Legacy
In his career which spanned 25 years facing 3 generations of strongmen, Žydrūnas has competed in more competitions than anyone else (153) and has won more international competitions than anyone else (84) as well. His winning percentage of 55% is seconded only to Mariusz Pudzianowski. However, the winning streak and number of victories of Žydrūnas Savickas, as evidenced by nearly 250 trophies and 200 medals, may never be matched. During an interview with strongman analyst Laurence Shahlaei in 2020, Žydrūnas said that Mariusz Pudzianowski, Svend Karlsen, Derek Poundstone, Brian Shaw and Hafþór Júlíus Björnsson are the 5 greatest strongmen he has competed against. 
 
In brief, Žydrūnas has dominated the following competitions:
 
World's Strongest Man – 1st place four times: 2009, 2010, 2012, 2014
World's Strongest Man – 2nd place six times: 2002–2004, 2011, 2013, 2015
IFSA Strongman World Championships – 1st place two times: 2005, 2006
Arnold Strongman Classic – 1st place eight times: 2003–2008, 2014, 2016
Arnold Strongman Classic-Europe – 1st place: 2012
Europe's Strongest Man – 1st place three times: 2010, 2012, 2013
Strongman Super Series – 1st place 2004 
Strongman Super Series – 2nd place 2003
Strongman Champions League – 1st place two times: 2012, 2008
Lithuania's Strongest Man – 1st place sixteen times: 1998–2000, 2002, 2004–2009, 2012–2015, 2017, 2020

Achievements
International & National Competitive Record – [1st (130),2nd (32),3rd (22) – Out of Total(218)]International wins: 84 from 153 competitions, National wins: 46 from 65 competitions

 Gallery 

Personal life
Savickas married his longtime girlfriend Jurgita Savickienė on July 24, 2010 in Lithuania.

At the end of September 2010, a biography entitled Žydrūnas Savickas – žmogus iš geležies'' (Žydrūnas Savickas – A Man Of Iron) was published in Lithuania.

Zydrunas Savickas has a YouTube channel where he talks on strongman related topics such as recovery, diet, and training habits. In June 2021, Žydrūnas and his wife Jurgita got divorced.

He got married for a second time on 12 October 2022 in Molėtai taking Brigita Lacytė to be his spouse.

See also 
List of strongmen
List of powerlifters

References

External links

Official Žydrūnas Savickas web site 
Official book about Žydrunas Savickas web site 
Official IFSA Strongman web site

1975 births
Lithuanian strength athletes
Living people
World record holders in weightlifting
People from Biržai
Lithuanian powerlifters